Manomohan Bose was a Bengali journalist, poet, and playwright.

Early life
Bose was born in 1831 in Nishchintapur, Jessore District, Bengal Presidency, British India at his maternal Uncle's house. He belonged to the famous Bose family of Chhota Jagulia, North 24 Parganas District of present-day West Bengal. He studied at the Sanskrit school in Jessore and Hare School in Calcutta. He then went onto to study at the Scottish Church College. He was inspired to write by Ishwar Chandra Gupta.

Career
Bose wrote for Ishwar Chandra Gupta's Sambad Prabhakar. His writings were also published in Akshay Kumar Datta's Tattvabodhini. He wrote in and edited Madhyastha in 1872 and Sambad Bibhakar in 1852. He wrote a number of plays based on history and mythology. His plays were nationalist in nature. He supported the Hindu Mela, a nationalist organization. In 1896 he was the Vice-President of Bangiya Sahitya Parishad.

Selected bibliography
Sati (1873)
Ramabhisek (1867)
Pranayapariksa (1869)
Harishchandra (1875)
Parthaparajay (1881)
Raslila (1889)
Anandamay (1889)
Hindur Achar-byabahar (1873)
Baktrtamala (1873) 
Dulin (1891). 
Manomohan Gitabali

Death
Bose died in 1912.

References

1831 births
1912 deaths
Bengali writers
20th-century Bengali poets
Bengali Hindus
People from Jessore District
Scottish Church College alumni
Dramatists and playwrights from West Bengal